Plestin-les-Grèves is a commune in the Côtes-d'Armor department of Brittany in north-western France.

Plestin-les-Grèves is situated on the north coast of Brittany, with a sailing club in Stefflam and Loquirec. There are a few riding schools.
Plestin-les-Grèves is twinned with Launceston in Cornwall, United Kingdom

Population
Inhabitants of Plestin-les-Grèves are called in French plestinais.

Breton language
The municipality launched a linguistic plan through Ya d'ar brezhoneg on 8 March 2006.

In 2008, 29.64% of primary school children attended bilingual schools.

See also
Communes of the Côtes-d'Armor department

References

External links

Official website 

Communes of Côtes-d'Armor